Palantir Technologies is a public American company that specializes in big data analytics. Headquartered in Denver, Colorado, it was founded by Peter Thiel, Nathan Gettings, Joe Lonsdale, Stephen Cohen, and Alex Karp in 2003. The company's name is derived from The Lord of the Rings where the magical palantíri were "seeing-stones," described as indestructible balls of crystal used for communication and to see events in other parts of the world.

The company is known for three projects in particular: Palantir Gotham, Palantir Apollo, and Palantir Foundry. Palantir Gotham is used by counter-terrorism analysts at offices in the United States Intelligence Community (USIC) and United States Department of Defense. In the past, Gotham was used by fraud investigators at the Recovery Accountability and Transparency Board, a former US federal agency which operated from 2009 to 2015. Gotham was also used by cyber analysts at Information Warfare Monitor, a Canadian public-private venture which operated from 2003 to 2012. Palantir Apollo is the operating system for continuous delivery and deployment across all environments. Their SaaS is one of five offerings authorized for Mission Critical National Security Systems (IL5) by the U.S. Department of Defense. Palantir Foundry is used by corporate clients such as Morgan Stanley, Merck KGaA, Airbus, Wejo, Lilium, and Fiat Chrysler Automobiles.

Palantir's original clients were federal agencies of the USIC. It has since expanded its customer base to serve state and local governments, as well as private companies in the financial and healthcare industries.

History

2003–2008: Founding and early years

Though usually listed as having been founded in 2004, SEC filings state Palantir's official incorporation to be in May 2003 by Peter Thiel (co-founder of PayPal), who named the start-up after the "seeing stone" in Tolkien's legendarium. Thiel saw Palantir as a "mission-oriented company" which could apply software similar to PayPal's fraud recognition systems to "reduce terrorism while preserving civil liberties."

In 2004, Thiel bankrolled the creation of a prototype by PayPal engineer Nathan Gettings and Stanford University students Joe Lonsdale and Stephen Cohen. That same year, Thiel hired Alex Karp, a former colleague of his from Stanford Law School, as chief executive officer.

Headquartered in Palo Alto, California, the company initially struggled to find investors. According to Karp, Sequoia Capital chairman Michael Moritz doodled through an entire meeting, and a Kleiner Perkins executive lectured the founders about the inevitable failure of their company. The only early investments were $2 million from the U.S. Central Intelligence Agency's venture capital arm In-Q-Tel, and $30 million from Thiel himself and his venture capital firm, Founders Fund.

Palantir developed its technology by computer scientists and analysts from intelligence agencies over three years, through pilots facilitated by In-Q-Tel. The company stated computers alone using artificial intelligence could not defeat an adaptive adversary. Instead, Palantir proposed using human analysts to explore data from many sources, called intelligence augmentation.

2009: GhostNet and the Shadow Network 
In 2009 and 2010 respectively, Information Warfare Monitor used Palantir software to uncover the GhostNet and the Shadow Network. The GhostNet was a China-based cyber espionage network targeting  1,295 computers in 103 countries, including the Dalai Lama’s office, a NATO computer and  various national embassies. The Shadow Network was also a China-based espionage operation that hacked into the Indian security and defense apparatus. Cyber spies stole documents related to Indian security and NATO troop activity in Afghanistan.

2010–2012: Expansion
In April 2010, Palantir announced a partnership with Thomson Reuters to sell the Palantir Metropolis product as "QA Studio" (a quantitative analysis tool).
On June 18, 2010, Vice President Joe Biden and Office of Management and Budget Director Peter Orszag held a press conference at the White House announcing the success of fighting fraud in the stimulus by the Recovery Accountability and Transparency Board (RATB).  Biden credited the success to the software, Palantir, being deployed by the federal government.  He announced that the capability will be deployed at other government agencies, starting with Medicare and Medicaid.

Estimates were $250 million in revenues in 2011.

2013–2016: Additional funding

A document leaked to TechCrunch revealed that Palantir's clients as of 2013 included at least twelve groups within the U.S. government, including the CIA, the DHS, the NSA, the FBI, the CDC, the Marine Corps, the Air Force, the Special Operations Command, the United States Military Academy, the Joint Improvised-Threat Defeat Organization and Allies, the Recovery Accountability and Transparency Board and the National Center for Missing and Exploited Children. However, at the time, the United States Army continued to use its own data analysis tool. Also, according to TechCrunch, the U.S. spy agencies such as the CIA and FBI were linked for the first time with Palantir software, as their databases had previously been "siloed."

In September 2013, Palantir disclosed over $196 million in funding according to a U.S. Securities and Exchange Commission filing. It was estimated that the company would likely close almost $1 billion in contracts in 2014. CEO Alex Karp announced in 2013 that the company would not be pursuing an IPO, as going public would make "running a company like ours very difficult." In December 2013, the company began a round of financing, raising around $450 million from private funders.  This raised the company's value to $9 billion, according to Forbes, with the magazine further explaining that the valuation made Palantir "among Silicon Valley’s most valuable private technology companies."

In December 2014, Forbes reported that Palantir was looking to raise $400 million in an additional round of financing, after the company filed paperwork with the Securities and Exchange Commission the month before. The report was based on research by VC Experts.  If completed, Forbes stated Palantir's funding could reach a total of $1.2 billion. As of December 2014, the company continued to have diverse private funders, Ken Langone and Stanley Druckenmiller, In-Q-Tel of the CIA, Tiger Global Management, and Founders Fund, which is a venture Firm operated by Peter Thiel, the chairman of Palantir. As of December 2014, Thiel was Palantir's largest shareholder.

The company was valued at $15 billion in November 2014. In June 2015, BuzzFeed reported the company was raising up to $500 million in new capital at a valuation of $20 billion. By December 2015, it had raised a further $880 million, while the company was still valued at $20 billion. In February 2016, Palantir bought Kimono Labs, a startup which makes it easy to collect information from public facing websites.

In August 2016, Palantir acquired data visualization startup Silk.

2020
Palantir is one of four large technology firms to start working with the NHS on supporting COVID-19 efforts through the provision of software from Palantir Foundry and by April 2020 several countries have used Palantir technology to track and contain the contagion.  Palantir also developed Tiberius, a software for vaccine allocation used in the United States.

In December 2020, Palantir was awarded a $44.4 million contract by the U.S. Food and Drug Administration, boosting its shares by about 21%.

Valuation
The company was valued at $9 billion in early 2014, with Forbes stating that the valuation made Palantir "among Silicon Valley's most valuable private technology companies". As of December 2014, Thiel was Palantir's largest shareholder. In January 2015, the company was valued at $15 billion after an undisclosed round of funding with $50 million in November 2014. This valuation rose to $20 billion in late 2015 as the company closed an $880 million round of funding. Palantir has never reported a profit. In 2018, Morgan Stanley valued the company at $6 billion.

Karp, Palantir's chief executive officer, announced in 2013 that the company would not pursue an IPO, as going public would make "running a company like ours very difficult". However, on October 18, 2018, the Wall Street Journal reported that Palantir was considering an IPO in the first half of 2019 following a $41 billion valuation. In July 2020, it was revealed the company had filed for an IPO.

It ultimately went public on the New York Stock Exchange through a direct public offering on September 30, 2020 under the ticker symbol "PLTR".

Investments
The company has invested over $400 million into nearly two dozen SPAC targets according to investment bank RBC Capital Markets, while bringing alongside those companies as customers.

Products

Palantir Gotham
Palantir Gotham is Palantir's government offering. It is an evolution of Palantir's longstanding work in the United States Intelligence Community. More recently, Palantir Gotham has been used as a predictive policing system, which has elicited some controversy over racism in their AI analytics.

Palantir Metropolis
Palantir Metropolis (formerly known as Palantir Finance) was software for data integration, information management and quantitative analytics.  The software connects to commercial, proprietary and public data sets and discovers trends, relationships and anomalies, including predictive analytics. Aided by 120 "forward-deployed engineers" of Palantir during 2009, Peter Cavicchia III of JPMorgan used Metropolis to monitor employee communications and alert the insider threat team when an employee showed any signs of potential disgruntlement: the insider alert team would further scrutinize the employee and possibly conduct physical surveillance after hours with bank security personnel. The Metropolis team used emails, download activity, browser histories, and GPS locations from JPMorgan owned smartphones and their transcripts of digitally recorded phone conversations to search, aggregate, sort, and analyze this information for any specific keywords, phrases, and patterns of behavior. In 2013, Cavicchia may have shared this information with Frank Bisignano who had become the CEO of First Data Corporation.

Palantir Apollo 
Palantir Apollo is a continuous delivery system that manages and deploys Palantir Gotham and Foundry. Apollo was built out of the need for customers to use multiple public and private cloud platforms as part of their infrastructure. Apollo orchestrates updates to configurations and software in the Foundry and Gotham platforms using a micro-service architecture. This product allows Palantir to provide software as a service (SaaS) rather than to operate as a consulting company.

Palantir Foundry 
Palantir Foundry was used by NHS England in dealing with the COVID-19 pandemic in England to analyze the operation of the vaccination program. A campaign was started against the company in June 2021 by Foxglove, a tech-justice nonprofit, because "Their background has generally been in contracts where people are harmed, not healed." Clive Lewis MP, supporting the campaign said Palantir had an "appalling track record."

Foundry is also used for the administration of the UK Homes for Ukraine program.  It gives caseworkers employed by local authorities access to data held by the Department for Levelling Up, Housing and Communities, some of which is supplied by the UK Home Office.

Other
The company has been involved in a number of business and consumer products, designing in part or in whole. For example, in 2014, they premiered Insightics, which according to the Wall Street Journal  "extracts customer spending and demographic information from merchants’ credit-card records." It was created in tandem with credit processing company First Data.

Customers

Corporate use

Palantir Metropolis is used by hedge funds, banks, and financial services firms.

Palantir Foundry clients include Merck KGaA, Airbus and Ferrari.

Palantir partner Information Warfare Monitor used Palantir software to uncover both the Ghostnet and the Shadow Network.

U.S. civil entities
Palantir's software is used by the Recovery Accountability and Transparency Board to detect and investigate fraud and abuse in the American Recovery and Reinvestment Act.  Specifically, the Recovery Operations Center (ROC) used Palantir to integrate transactional data with open-source and private data sets that describe the entities receiving stimulus funds. Other clients as of 2019 included Polaris Project, the Centers for Disease Control and Prevention, the National Center for Missing and Exploited Children, the National Institutes of Health, Team Rubicon, and the United Nations World Food Programme.

In October 2020, Palantir began helping the federal government set up a system that will track the manufacture, distribution and administration of COVID-19 vaccines across the country.

U.S. military, intelligence, and police
Palantir Gotham is used by counter-terrorism analysts at offices in the United States Intelligence Community and United States Department of Defense, fraud investigators at the Recovery Accountability and Transparency Board, and cyber analysts at Information Warfare Monitor (responsible for the GhostNet and the Shadow Network investigation).

Other clients as of 2013 included DHS, NSA, FBI, CDC, the Marine Corps, the Air Force, Special Operations Command, West Point, the Joint IED Defeat Organization and Allies. However, at the time the United States Army continued to use its own data analysis tool. Also, according to TechCrunch, "The U.S. spy agencies also employed Palantir to connect databases across departments. Before this, most of the databases used by the CIA and FBI were siloed, forcing users to search each database individually. Now everything is linked together using Palantir."

U.S. military intelligence used the Palantir product to improve their ability to predict locations of improvised explosive devices in its war in Afghanistan. A small number of practitioners reported it to be more useful than the United States Army's Program of Record, the Distributed Common Ground System (DCGS-A). California Congressman Duncan D. Hunter complained of United States Department of Defense obstacles to its wider use in 2012.

Palantir has also been reported to be working with various U.S. police departments, for example accepting a contract in 2013 to help the Northern California Regional Intelligence Center build a controversial license plates database for California. In 2012 New Orleans Police Department partnered with Palantir to create a predictive policing program.

In 2014, US Immigration and Customs Enforcement (ICE) awarded Palantir a $41 million contract to build and maintain a new intelligence system called Investigative Case Management (ICM) to track personal and criminal records of legal and illegal immigrants. This application has originally been conceived by ICE's office of Homeland Security Investigations (HSI), allowing its users access to intelligence platforms maintained by other federal and private law enforcement entities. The system reached its "final operation capacity" under the Trump administration in September 2017.

Palantir took over the Pentagon's Project Maven contract in 2019 after Google decided not to continue developing AI unmanned drones used for bombings and intelligence.

International Atomic Energy Agency
Palantir was used by the International Atomic Energy Agency (IAEA) to verify if Iran was in compliance with the 2015 agreement.

Europe
The firm has contracts relating to patient data from the British National Health Service. It was awarded an emergency, no-competition contract to mine COVID-19 patient data in 2019. In 2020 this was valued at more than £23.5 million and was extended for two more years.  The firm was encouraged by Liam Fox "to expand their software business" in Britain.  It was said to be " critical to the success of the vaccination and PPE programmes,” but its involvement in the NHS was controversial among civil liberties groups.

The Danish POL-INTEL predictive policing project has been operational since 2017 and is based on the Gotham system. According to the AP the Danish system "uses a mapping system to build a so-called heat map identifying areas with higher crime rates." The Gotham system has also been used by German state police in Hesse and Europol.

The Norwegian Customs is using Palantir Gotham to screen passengers and vehicles for control. Known inputs are prefiled freight documents, passenger lists, the national Currency Exchange database (tracks all cross-border currency exchanges), the Norwegian Welfare Administrations employer- and employee-registry, the Norwegian stock holder registry and 30 public databases from InfoTorg. InfoTorg provides access to more than 30 databases, including the Norwegian National Citizen registry, European Business Register, the Norwegian DMV vehicle registry, various credit databases etc. These databases are supplemented by the Norwegian Customs Departments own intelligence reports, including results of previous controls. The system is also augmented by data from public sources such as social media.

NHS England's former artificial intelligence chief, Indra Joshi, was recruited by the company in 2022.  The company said they were planning to increase their team in the UK by 250.

Ukraine 
Palantir's technology is used close to the front line. It is used to shorten the "kill chain" in Russo-Ukrainian War.

Partnerships and contracts

International Business Machines
On February 8, 2021, Palantir and IBM announced a new partnership that would use IBM's hybrid cloud data platform alongside Palantir's operations platform for building applications. The product, Palantir for IBM Cloud Pak for Data, is expected to simplify the process of building and deploying AI-integrated applications with IBM Watson. It will help businesses/users interpret and use large datasets without needing a strong technical background. Palantir for IBM Cloud Pak for Data will be available for general use in March 2021.

Amazon (AWS)
On March 5, 2021, Palantir announced its partnership with Amazon AWS. Palantir's ERP Suite is now optimized to run on Amazon Web Services. One of the first notable successes of the ERP suite was with BP, which was able to save about $50 million in working capital within two weeks of onboarding the system.

Babylon Health
Palantir took a stake in Babylon Health in June 2021. Ali Parsa told the Financial Times that "nobody" has brought some of the tech that Palantir owns "into the realm of biology and health care".

Controversies

Algorithm development
i2 Inc sued Palantir in Federal Court alleging fraud, conspiracy, and copyright infringement over Palantir's algorithm. Shyam Sankar, Palantir's director of business development, used a private eye company as the cutout for obtaining i2's code. i2 settled out of court for $10 million in 2011.

WikiLeaks proposals (2010)
In 2010, Hunton & Williams LLP allegedly asked Berico Technologies, Palantir, and HBGary Federal to draft a response plan to "the WikiLeaks Threat." In early 2011 Anonymous publicly released HBGary-internal documents, including the plan. The plan proposed that Palantir software would "serve as the foundation for all the data collection, integration, analysis, and production efforts."  The plan also included slides, allegedly authored by HBGary CEO Aaron Barr, which suggested "[spreading] disinformation" and "disrupting" Glenn Greenwald’s support for WikiLeaks.

Palantir CEO Karp ended all ties to HBGary and issued a statement apologizing to "progressive organizations… and Greenwald … for any involvement that we may have had in these matters." Palantir placed an employee on leave pending a review by a third-party law firm. The employee was later reinstated.

Racial discrimination lawsuit (2016)
On September 26, 2016, the Office of Federal Contract Compliance Programs of the U.S. Department of Labor filed a lawsuit against Palantir alleging that the company discriminated against Asian job applicants on the basis of their race. According to the lawsuit, the company "routinely eliminated" Asian applicants during the hiring process, even when they were "as qualified as white applicants" for the same jobs. Palantir settled the suit in April 2017 for $1.7 million while not admitting wrongdoing.

British Parliament inquiry (2018)
During questioning in front of the Digital, Culture, Media and Sport Select Committee, Christopher Wylie, the former research director of Cambridge Analytica, said that several meetings had taken place between Palantir and Cambridge Analytica, and that Alexander Nix, the chief executive of SCL, had facilitated their use of Aleksandr Kogan's data which had been obtained from his app "thisisyourdigitallife" by mining personal surveys. Kogan later established Global Science Research to share the data with Cambridge Analytica and others. Wylie confirmed that both employees from Cambridge Analytica and Palantir used Kogan's Global Science Research and harvested Facebook data together in the same offices.

ICE partnership (since 2014)
Palantir has come under criticism due to its partnership developing software for U.S. Immigration and Customs Enforcement. Palantir has responded that its software is not used to facilitate deportations. In a statement provided to the New York Times, the firm implied that because its contract was with HSI, a division of ICE focused on investigating criminal activities, it played no role in deportations. However, documents obtained by The Intercept show that this is not the case. According to these documents, Palantir's ICM software is considered 'mission critical' to ICE. Other groups critical of Palantir include the Brennan Center for Justice, National Immigration Project, the Immigrant Defense Project, the Tech Workers Coalition and Mijente. In one internal ICE report Mijente acquired, it was revealed that Palantir's software was critical in an operation to arrest the parents of undocumented migrant children.

On September 28, 2020, Amnesty International released a report criticizing Palantir failure to conduct human rights due diligence around its contracts with ICE. Concerns around Palantir's rights record were being scrutinized for contributing to human rights violations of asylum-seekers and migrants.

"HHS Protect Now" and privacy concerns (since 2020)

The ongoing COVID-19 pandemic has prompted tech companies to respond to growing demand for citizen information from governments in order to conduct contact tracing and to analyze patient data. Consequently, data collection companies, such as Palantir, have been contracted to partake in pandemic data collection practices. Palantir's participation in "HHS Protect Now", a program launched by the United States Department of Health and Human Services to track the spread of the coronavirus, has attracted criticism from American lawmakers.

Palantir's participation in COVID-19 response projects re-ignited debates over its controversial involvement in tracking undocumented immigrants, especially its alleged effects on digital inequality and potential restrictions on online freedoms. Critics allege that confidential data acquired by HHS could be exploited by other federal agencies in unregulated and potentially harmful ways. Alternative proposals request greater transparency in the process to determine whether any of the data aggregated would be shared with the US Immigration and Customs Enforcement to single out undocumented immigrants.

Project Maven (since 2018)

After Google had issues with employees walking out concerning the new contract in partnership with the Pentagon, Project Maven, a secret artificial intelligence program aimed at the unmanned operation of aerial vehicles, was taken up by Palantir. Critics warn that the technology could lead to autonomous weapons that decide who to strike without human input.

See also
 Government by algorithm

References

External links 
 

2003 establishments in California
Analytics companies
Big data companies
Business software companies
Companies based in Denver
American companies established in 2003
Data brokers
 
Criminal investigation
Software companies based in Colorado
Software companies of the United States
Government by algorithm
Software companies established in 2003
Companies listed on the New York Stock Exchange
Direct stock offerings
Link analysis
Things named after Tolkien works